The Hawker Hedgehog was a three-seat reconnaissance biplane, to be used for naval scouting, produced to meet Air Ministry Specification 37/22.

It was designed in 1923, and had its first flight the next year, piloted by F. P. Raynham.
The crew consisted of the pilot, an observer and an air gunner. Its construction was typical of the period: a wooden structure covered with fabric. The powerplant was a nine-cylinder Bristol Jupiter IV radial engine driving a two-bladed wooden propeller.

While testing was successful, on completion of the flight tests, the project was cancelled. This was due to the Hedgehog's performance not being sufficiently better than the existing aircraft used for naval reconnaissance, the Avro Bison and Blackburn Blackburn. Consequently, only one prototype was built. The armament of the aircraft was one fixed forward-firing .303 in (7.7 mm) Vickers gun and one .303 in (7.7 mm) Lewis gun on a Scarff ring in the rear cockpit. The aircraft was fitted with floats that contained wheels to enable use as an amphibian. The wings could be folded, so that the width was reduced to 16 ft 7½ in (4.87 m) for storage.

Specifications

References

 Mason, Francis K. Hawker Aircraft since 1920 London:Putnam, 1991. .

1920s British military reconnaissance aircraft
Hedgehog
Biplanes
Single-engined tractor aircraft
Carrier-based aircraft
Aircraft first flown in 1924